"World is Dead" is the second single by the Irish band Juniper, the precursor to Bell X1 and Damien Rice. It was released in June 1998 and spent two weeks in the Irish Singles Chart after entering on 21 May, breaking into the Top 20 and achieving a peak of nineteenth position. "Weatherman" was released on the Mercury Records label. It featured three B-sides, "You", "Orchard" and the Bobby Wonder remix of the band's debut single "Weatherman".

Track listing 
CDS 567067/2
 "World is Dead" - (3:38)
 "You" - (4:36)
 "Orchard" - (4:33)
 "Weatherman" (Bobby Wonder remix) - (5:13)

Chart performance

References

External links 
 Juniper discography at Irish Music Central

1998 singles
Juniper (band) songs
1998 songs
Songs written by Damien Rice
Mercury Records singles
Songs written by Paul Noonan
Songs written by Brian Crosby (composer)
Songs written by David Geraghty